Machias is a census-designated place (CDP) in Snohomish County, Washington, United States. The population was 1,178 at the 2010 census.

Machias was laid out in 1888, and named after Machias, Maine, the ancestral home of a first settler. A post office called Machias was established in 1892, and remained in operation until 1943.

Geography
Machias is located at  (47.997610, -122.047196).

According to the United States Census Bureau, the CDP has a total area of 2.3 mi2 (5.9 km2), all land.

Demographics
As of the census of 2000, there were 1,015 people, 344 households, and 267 families residing in the CDP. The population density was 448.1 people per square mile (172.6/km2). There were 362 housing units at an average density of 159.8/sq mi (61.6/km2). The racial makeup of the CDP was 95.47% White, 0.99% African American, 0.20% Native American, 0.30% Asian, 1.08% from other races, and 1.97% from two or more races. Hispanic or Latino of any race were 2.07% of the population.

There were 344 households, out of which 43.3% had children under the age of 18 living with them, 68.6% were married couples living together, 4.9% had a female householder with no husband present, and 22.1% were non-families. 14.8% of all households were made up of individuals, and 2.9% had someone living alone who was 65 years of age or older. The average household size was 2.95, and the average family size was 3.29.

In the CDP, the age distribution of the population shows 32.0% under the age of 18, 6.4% from 18 to 24, 33.2% from 25 to 44, 21.9% from 45 to 64, and 6.5% who were 65 years of age or older. The median age was 35 years. For every 100 females, there were 112.3 males. For every 100 females age 18 and over, there were 111.0 males.

The median income for a household in the CDP was $75,000, and the median income for a family was $79,112. Males had a median income of $47,941 versus $34,375 for females. The per capita income for the CDP was $27,961. About 2.1% of families and 3.5% of the population were below the poverty line, including 6.8% of those under age 18 and none of those age 65 or over.

References

Census-designated places in Washington (state)
Census-designated places in Snohomish County, Washington